State Highway 51 (SH 51) is a State Highway in Kerala, India that starts in Kodakara on NH 544 and ends in Kodungallur on NH 66. The highway is 27 km long.

The Route Map 
Kodakara (NH 544)- Manakulagara - Koprakkalam - Pulipparakkunnu - Aloor- Kombodinjamakkal - Ashtamichira- Vadama - Mala- Poyya- Krishnan kotta- Keezhthali  (joins NH 66)- Kodungallur

See also 
Roads in Kerala
List of State Highways in Kerala

References 

State Highways in Kerala
Roads in Thrissur district